Emmett O' Brien Technical High School, or O' Brien Tech, is a technical high school located in Ansonia, Connecticut. It is in the Connecticut Technical High School System. O' Brien Tech receives students from many nearby towns.

Technologies
In addition to a complete academic program leading to a high school diploma, students attending O' Brien Tech receive training in one of the following trades and technologies:

 Automotive Technology
 Carpentry
 Culinary Arts
 Electrical
 Hairdressing and Cosmetology
 Health Technology
 Heating, Ventilation and Air Conditioning (HVAC)
 Information Technology
 Mechanical Design and Engineering Technology
 Precision Machining Technology

Athletics 

Fall
 Football
 Soccer
 Volleyball
 Powderpuff

Winter
 Girls Basketball
 Boys Basketball

Spring
 Baseball
 Softball
 Outdoor track
 Golf

References

External links
 

Buildings and structures in Ansonia, Connecticut
Schools in New Haven County, Connecticut
Public high schools in Connecticut